Madame X is a 1908 stage play with numerous adaptations.

Madame X or Madam X may also refer to:

Film
 Madame X (1916 film), starring Dorothy Donnelly
 Madame X (1920 film), starring Pauline Frederick
 Madame X (1929 film), starring Ruth Chatterton
 Madame X (1937 film), starring Gladys George
 Madame X (1952 film), starring Gloria Romero
 Madame X (1954 film), a Greek drama film
 Madame X (1955 film), a Mexican drama film
 Madame X (1966 film), starring Lana Turner
 Madame X: An Absolute Ruler,  1978 German fantasy film directed by Ulrike Ottinger
 Madame X (1981 film), starring Tuesday Weld
 Madam X (1994 film), starring Rekha
 Madame X (2000 film), starring Ina Raymundo
 Madame X (2021 film), a documentary film about Madonna's Madame X Tour

Music
 Madam X (band), an American glam metal band
 Madame X (band), an American funk/R&B band with an eponymous 1987 album release
 Madame X (album), 2019 studio album by Madonna
 Madame X Tour, associated concert tour

Other uses
 Madame X, a character played by Anne Brochet in The Story of Marie and Julien
 Madame X (device), a bombe cryptanalyser used by the US Army during World War II
 Madame Xanadu, a 2012 comic called "Madame X" which featured this character under DC's "National Comics" imprint
 "Madame X", internal code name for the Pontiac Phantom concept car
 Madame X, a nickname of American singer Madonna, given by Martha Graham
 Madame X, a nickname for Agnes Meyer Driscoll, an 20th-century American cryptanalyst.
 Limeslade Mystery, also known as the Madame X Mystery

See also
 The Trial of Madame X, 1948 film
 The Strange Madame X, 1951 film
 Portrait of Madame X, an 1884 portrait of Virginie Amélie Avegno Gautreau by John Singer Sargent
 Miss X (disambiguation)
 Lady X (disambiguation)
 Mister X (disambiguation)